"Together in Electric Dreams" is a song by the British singer and composer Philip Oakey and Italian composer and producer Giorgio Moroder. It was written by Oakey and Moroder and recorded for the original soundtrack of the film Electric Dreams (1984). It later formed part of the joint album Philip Oakey & Giorgio Moroder, released in 1985.

Released as a single in the United Kingdom in September 1984, it proved a major commercial success, even eclipsing the original film it was intended to promote. It reached No. 3 in the UK Singles Chart, staying in the charts for thirteen weeks. The single also hit the Australian Top 5, and had minor chart success in New Zealand and the Netherlands.

It was the only song from the brief partnership of Oakey and Moroder that achieved commercial success.

The film Electric Dreams was director Steve Barron's first full feature film. Barron's prior work included conceiving and directing a number of innovative music videos during the beginning of the 1980s. His biggest success up to that point had been as director of the music video for The Human League's "Don't You Want Me" in 1981, which helped the single become number one in the United Kingdom and United States.

Background 
For the film, Barron wanted to emulate the huge success of Flashdance a year earlier. Flashdance had used the electronic music of Giorgio Moroder, so Barron enlisted Moroder as director of music, who wrote most of the score. Barron wanted the end credits to roll to "an emotional" song in the same way as Flashdance had done.

Moroder wrote "Together in Electric Dreams" as a male solo vocal, and Barron suggested his former associate Philip Oakey for the part.

After the initial full recording of the song was completed, Moroder told Oakey that the first take was "good enough, as first time is always best". Oakey, who thought he was just rehearsing, insisted on doing another take. Moroder agreed, though Oakey believes that Moroder still used the first take on the final production.

Originally released to advertise the film, "Together in Electric Dreams" quickly overshadowed the original film, and became a success in its own right. Oakey stated that it is ironic that a track that took literally ten minutes to record would become a worldwide hit, while some of his Human League material that took over a year to record did not.

"Together in Electric Dreams" is set in the key of E♭ major in common time with a tempo of 130 beats per minute.

Instruments used on the track included a Roland Jupiter-8 and a LinnDrum.

Music video
The promotional video was originally designed to promote the film Electric Dreams rather than the song, and this was how most viewers in the United States would see it. In the United Kingdom, where the original film was a flop, the promotional video was perceived to be a music video first, and often erroneously a Human League video.

Like many film soundtrack promos, the video splices key scenes from the film with footage of Oakey. In addition, other promotional scenes were created especially for the video: an Electric Dreams signboard is seen behind Oakey twice, the actual poster is seen behind him on the freeway and the computer from the film is seen relaxing on the beach.

Oakey is seen being driven around what is purportedly San Francisco (actually Los Angeles) singing the lyrics. The video concludes with a sock puppet parody of the MGM Lion on a television screen, on a beach. Moroder himself makes a cameo appearance, as the boss of the radio station taken over by the computer.

Charts

Weekly charts

Year-end charts

Certifications

In the media
 The song was used in the video game Grand Theft Auto: Vice City Stories as one of the songs on the fictional in-game radio station Flash FM.
 It was used as the theme tune of 2009 BBC Television documentary series Electric Dreams.
 It was used in an advert by EDF Energy in April 2012. This contributed to the song re-entering the charts that year.

Association with The Human League

Philip Oakey is the lead singer of the British synthpop band The Human League. "Together in Electric Dreams" is often erroneously credited as a Human League single. It was also released at the height of the band's international fame and success; because of this popularity the single has been included in the band's various Greatest Hits compilation albums.

Although the Human League have never recorded their own version, due to the song's popularity the band frequently play their own version when they perform live, often as an encore. The Human League version differs considerably from the Giorgio Moroder produced original in that it has a longer, more dramatic intro and female backing vocals by Susan Ann Sulley and Joanne Catherall, which are as prominent as Oakey's lead.

Cover versions

Together in Electric Dreams (EP)

Together in Electric Dreams is an EP, released in the United Kingdom in November 2007. It was produced by Rob da Bank, and released by Sunday Best Recordings.

The album features five very different interpretations of "Together in Electric Dreams". The only track not especially commissioned for the album was the version by Lali Puna, which had previously been released on the tribute album Reproductions: Songs of The Human League (2000).

Track listing
"Together in Electric Dreams" – Kish Mauve
"Together in Electric Dreams" – Le Vicarious Bliss Pop Experience featuring Headbangirl
"Together in Electric Dreams" – Daisy Daisy
"Together in Electric Dreams" – Subway
"Together in Electric Dreams" – Lali Puna

Seasonal versions
During Christmas 2020, a seasonal version of the song was released by Somerset duo The Portraits and their daughter, singer Ciara Mill, reaching number 2 in the iTunes chart.
In 2021, a similar cover of the song by Lola Young was used in the John Lewis Christmas advert. This new version led many in the media to draw comparisons between Young's version and The Portraits' take on the song, and the duo subsequently put out a statement confirming that they had offered their version in March 2021 to John Lewis for a future Christmas ad, but that the company had never replied. Despite agreeing that these communications had indeed taken place, John Lewis & Partners denied copying The Portraits' song. Subsequently, however, they made a 'substantial' donation to the two charities to which the Millingtons had originally donated all the proceeds from their 2020 version. The John Lewis & Partners advert marked the second time in two years that a cover of "Together in Electric Dreams" was used in a major advertising campaign, as an upbeat acoustic guitar-based version by the duo Waters/Kinley was filmed in The Schooner pub, Gateshead for a Strongbow commercial in 2019.

The Portraits: Release history

Lola Young: Release history

References

External links
 Together in Electric Dreams at Discogs
 Together in Electric Dreams music video at Clipland

1984 singles
Giorgio Moroder songs
Philip Oakey songs
Kish Mauve songs
Song recordings produced by Giorgio Moroder
Songs written for films
Songs written by Giorgio Moroder
Songs written by Philip Oakey
1984 songs
Virgin Records singles
Songs about dreams